Grevillea 'Molly'  is a grevillea cultivar first made available to the public in 2003. It is a cross between G. aurea and G. bipinnatifida, chosen from seedlings which were bred by Owen Brown of Golden Beach, Queensland in 1997.

Prominently displayed above the foliage, the deep pink inflorescences resemble those of G. 'Robyn Gordon'.

See also
 List of Grevillea cultivars

Molly
Cultivars of Australian plants
Proteales of Australia
Garden plants of Australia